The Dadu River also called Wu River, is a major river located in the  Northwest of Taiwan. With a total length of  it is sixth-longest river on the  island.

Names
The Dadu River is named after a former port near its mouth, now the Dadu District of Taichung.

The same name appears in English as the  the pinyin romanization of its Mandarin pronunciation. It received the name from the many black-winged birds that used to live along the river.

Geography
It is the 6th-longest river on Taiwan Island and the 4th-largest in terms of drainage area.

See also

List of rivers in Taiwan

References

Citations

Bibliography

 .
 .

Rivers of Taiwan
Landforms of Changhua County
Landforms of Taichung
Landforms of Nantou County